Pujato Bluff is a rock bluff, 660 m, forming the south end of Schneider Hills in the Argentina Range, Pensacola Mountains. Mapped by United States Geological Survey (USGS) from surveys and U.S. Navy air photos, 1956–67. Named by Advisory Committee on Antarctic Names (US-ACAN) for General Hernan Pujato, officer in charge of Argentine wintering parties at General Belgrano Station in 1955 and 1956.

Cliffs of Queen Elizabeth Land